Tammas is the first album by Samir Joubran duo with his brother Wissam Joubran, released  in 2003 labelled "daquí", by Harmonia Mundi.

Track listing
 "Khiyanat Mariha" - 4:11
 "Tamaas" - 7:49
 "Tanaas" - 6:05
 "Sama'E Bayat" - 7:30
 "Khalaas" - 10:18
 "Takaseem" - 6:36
 "Ramallah August 10" - 10:09
 "El Nesf El Akhar/Astoria" - 9:08

References 

2003 albums